The National Congress of the Chinese Communist Party (literally: Chinese Communist Party National Representatives Congress) is a party congress that is held every five years. The National Congress is theoretically the highest body within the Chinese Communist Party (CCP). Since 1987 the National Congress has been held in the months of October or November. The venue for the event, beginning in 1956, is the Great Hall of the People in Beijing. The Congress is the public venue for top-level leadership changes in the CCP and the formal event for changes to the Party's Constitution. In the past two decades the National Congress of the CCP has been pivotal at least as a symbolic part of leadership changes, and therefore has gained international media attention.

The Congress formally approves the membership of the Central Committee, a body composed of the top decision-makers in the party, state, and society. In practice, however, only slightly more candidates than open seats are nominated for the Central Committee, limiting the Congress's role in the selection process to eliminating very unpopular candidates. Each five-year cycle of the National People's Congress also has a series of plenums of the Central Committee which since the mid-1990s have been held more or less regularly once every year.

From the mid-1980s to the late-2010s, the CCP has attempted to maintain a smooth and orderly succession and avoiding a cult of personality, by having a major shift in personnel every ten years in even number party congresses, and by promoting people in preparation for this shift in odd number party congresses. In addition, as people at the top level of the party retire, there is room for younger members of the party to move up one level. Hence the party congress is a time of a general personnel reshuffle, and the climax of negotiations that involve not only the top leadership but practically all significant political positions in China. Because of the pyramid structure of the party and the existence of mandatory retirement ages, cadres who are not promoted at a party congress are likely to face the end of their political careers.

Similar to the practice of the NPC, the delegates to the Congress are formally selected from grassroots party organizations, and like the NPC, there is a system of staggered elections in which one level of the party votes for the delegates to the next higher level. For the National Congress, delegates are elected by the CCP's provincial level party congresses or their equivalent units in a selection process that is screened and supervised by the party's Organization Department as directed by the Politburo Standing Committee (PSC).

Preparation 
The party rules state that just before the National Congress, a preparatory committee must be established by the Politburo, with the current general secretary of the CCP generally chairing the committee. This committee oversees the election of the few thousand delegates to the National Congress and prepares a list of candidates to be elected to the Central Committee and its bodies, including the Politburo, PSC, Secretariat and the Central Military Commission. It additionally establishes a drafting committee that drafts the work report of the CCP general secretary, and also establishes a group that proposes amendments to the CCP constitution.

On the day before the first session of the National Congress, the incumbent General Secretary presides over a preparatory meeting of the congress's delegates. At this meeting he formally proposes the candidates for the Presidium of the National Congress and a congress Secretary-General for approval as a single list. After undergoing the formality of election, the Presidium subsequently convenes on the same day and elects a Standing Committee to manage the procedural affairs of the National Congress during its sessions.

The Standing Committee of the Presidium of the National Congress (SCPNC) has been said to be the "leading core" of the Party Congress. It discusses and seeks consent on important issues related to the candidates and accordingly proposes solutions to the Presidium, chairs the plenary meetings of the Presidium and the electoral proceedings, reviews the rehearsal voting outcomes and submits a list of official candidates to the Presidium for discussion and approval. One of the major roles of the Presidium Standing Committee is to submit to the Party Congress Presidium a list of people who would chair the first plenary meeting of the newly elected Central Committee, thereby ensuring leadership continuity during the formal procedure that is used to elect the Politburo, the PSC and the General Secretary.

In recent elections, the members of the SCPNC have included all members of the Politburo and the Secretariat. The size of the committee is not fixed and, in contingency situations, can also include other actors from the party and the state. Since 2002, all living and non-expelled former PSC members have also been members of the committee. This means that the Standing Committee of the National Congress Presidium essentially encompasses the de facto selectorate for the new Politburo and Standing Committee. According to Ling Li, who teaches Chinese studies in the University of Vienna, this system allows for peaceful transitions of power by allowing former and current party leaders to influence outcomes.

Keys

Convocations

Notes

References

Citations

Sources 

Information on congresses, number of delegates, electoral units, number of people elected to CCs, party membership, the individual who presented the Political Report and information on when the congress was convened can be found in these sources:

Further reading 

 

 
China, Communist Party
Recurring events established in 1921
1921 establishments in China